Sikorrachi railway stop is a railway stop that serves the village of Sykorrachi in Eastern Macedonia and Thrace, Greece. Located in the centre of the village, The journey from Sikorrachi to Alexandroupli takes around 37 mins.

History

Facilities
The stop is equipped solely with a stone-built waiting room on the single platform. There are however two automatic level-crossings on either side of the station, installed by Bombardier. There is also a small restaurant across the road from the stop. The unstaffed halt has however been the victim of graffiti and vandalism but has since been repaired.

Services
 the stop is served by one train per day, to/from Alexandroupoli and Thessaloniki.

Stop layout

References

External links
 Sykorrachi Station - National Railway Network Greek Travel Pages

Railway stations in Eastern Macedonia and Thrace
Buildings and structures in Evros (regional unit)
Alexandroupolis